Australian Jews in Israel refers to Australian-born individuals of Jewish descent, who have emigrated to Israel (Aliyah in Jewish communities). Jews understand Aliyah to be a spiritual journey as a result of their emotional connection to the land of their people. Since 1950, when the Law of Return was passed by the Israeli Knesset (parliament), diasporic Jews have been given legal provisions to acquire citizenship in Israel based on their Jewish heritage. The total population of Israel, as of December 2019, was 9,316,000 and, according to the Australian Department of Foreign Affairs and Trade, there were roughly 10,000–12,000 Australians living in Israel, suggested by data from the most recent census that was held in 2016. Immigrants in Israel, known as Olim, are required to complete national service, usually serving in the Israel Defense Force. However, the length of service is dependent on an immigrant's age, as well as their family status, when they arrive in Israel. New immigrants are given assistance from the government to encourage integration.

History
In 1948, the State of Israel was established, allowing Jews from around the world to make Aliyah, without difficulty. Many understood the establishment of Israel as a public way of making up for the atrocities of the Holocaust. When the Jews in the concentration camps were released at the end of World War II, the large majority of them were forced to immigrate to other nations, however, due to the difficulty of gaining access into Israel, many fled elsewhere, including Australia, who received between 7000 and 8000 Jewish refugees from countries including Germany, Czechoslovakia and Austria. These migration patterns led to Australian Jews feeling a strong connection to the State of Israel, as they had a land that was known as the land of the Jewish people on a global scale. Prior to the establishment of Israel, the land was home to approximately 600,000 Jews, however, by 2007 the total number of Jews living in Israel was 5.5 million. According to census data that was released by the Central Bureau of Statistics on December 31, 2019, there were 9,136,000 people living in Israel and 74.1% were Jewish. From 2008 to 2012, more than 400 Australian Jews moved to Israel and most of them have done compulsory military service. There was an almost 50 percent increase in immigration from Australia to Israel between 2009 and 2010. There was a 45 percent increase in percentage of immigration in 2010, the highest of the English-speaking countries; 240 Australians moved to Israel, up from 165 in 2009.

Legislation 
The Law of Return is an essential legal document that was passed by the Israeli Knesset (parliament) in 1950, soon after the State of Israel was established, allowing for the Jews to have sovereignty over Israel, in which citizenship was granted upon one's religion. According to the Law of Return, there are three definitions that differentiate Jews from non-Jews. A person who was born to a Jewish mother; a person who has officially converted to Judaism or a person who is not associated with another religion, are all legally classified as a Jew under the law. This allows Jews living in the diaspora, who fall under at least one of the above criteria, to move to Israel and become an Israeli citizen without a particular reason apart from being Jewish. There have only been two amendments of the law, a minor amendment in 1954 and a more significant amendment in 1970. Even though Jews are given Israeli citizenship based on their religion, they are still obligated to complete certain requirements, such as mandatory military service in the Israel Defense Force.

Immigrants 
The term ‘immigrant’ refers to an individual that has left their country of origin and taken up permanent residency elsewhere. In Israel, immigrants are referred to as ‘new olim’. In 1995, the population of the West Bank, a section of land that is under Israeli military control, had a significant number of new immigrants (olim) from North America as well as Australia and New Zealand. 2.1% of residents located in the West Bank were citizens born in Israel while the number of citizens who had made Aliyah was found to be 9.4% of the West Bank's population. Australia is said to have the highest rate per capita, in the Western world, of Jews making Aliyah. In 2019, within a time frame of 9 months, Israel became home to nearly 30,000 new immigrants, of which 143 were Australian.

Requirements 
New immigrants are required to undertake a form of mandatory service upon arrival in Israel, which is usually military service in the Israel Defense Force. The requirements for new immigrants, regarding military service, applies only to those between the ages of 18 and 27. Immigrants who arrive in Israel at the age of 28 or older are exempt from completing any form of mandatory service for the state. Additionally, if an immigrant is under the age of 18, the same requirements apply to them as they would to an Israeli-born citizen, regardless of their family status. Male immigrants who are 18 or 19, upon arrival in Israel, serve for 32 months if they are single and 24 months if they are married, regardless if they have children or not. Male immigrants who are 20 or 21 years old, upon arrival, serve 24 months if they are single and 18 months if they are married. If they are between the ages of 22 and 27, they must serve 18 months in non-combat service and 24 months in combat service. All female immigrants, regardless of their family status, serve 24 months at the age of 18 or 19, 12 months at the age of 20 or 21 and 12 months in non-combat service and 24 months in combat service if they are between the ages of 22 and 27.

Assistance 
New immigrants in Israel are entitled to various benefits, provided by the Israeli government, in order to make the immigration process more manageable. The Israeli government provides new immigrants, who are making Aliyah from various parts of the Jewish diaspora, with a free flight to Israel and upon arrival to Ben Gurion Airport they are given a free ride to their first destination. New immigrants are entitled to bring in up to 50,000 NIS (Israeli currency) without reporting the amount to a customs officer upon arrival. Additionally, they can bring in appliances and home goods, for up to 3 years, without paying tax. The Ministry of Aliyah and Integration provides new immigrants with financial assistance, through monthly installments, for 6 months. The first installment is received, as a cash payment, upon arrival at Ben Gurion Airport, while the remaining installments are transferred to the immigrant's bank account. New immigrants in Israel are entitled to take part in a full time Hebrew language course, free of charge. Newly immigrated parents are entitled to a reduction in daycare fees, for up to 2 years, if they fall within the eligible criteria list. If both parents are enrolled in the Hebrew language course or registered as unemployed and seeking a job, they are entitled to a daycare fee reduction. They are also entitled to this reduction if one parent is taking part in the Hebrew language course and the other parents is registered as unemployed and seeking a job. For young immigrants, university tuition is subsidized, however, the extent of the subsidy depends on their age. Young immigrants are entitled to a subsidy for their preparation course, up until the age of 23; their Bachelor's course, up until the age of 27; and their Master's course, up until the age of 30. In order to help new immigrants, tax rates are reduced when purchasing property or a vehicle as well as when income tax is paid. The Ministry of Housing also assists in rent subsidy for up to 5 years from the date an immigrant receives their 'Oleh' status.

Demographics 
Between 2018 and 2019, Monash University, located in Melbourne, surveyed 386 Australian Jews who had immigrated to Israel (Aliyah). The results provided extensive information regarding their country of birth, previous city of residence, age, gender, religious observance, motivations for immigrating, education, Hebrew fluency, economic status and type of residency.

Demographics 
The most dominant group amongst the Olim were the Australian-born Jews, who made up 81% of the surveyed population. The remaining percentage revealed that they were born in other parts of the world before migrating to Australia.

Previous City of Residence 
More than half of the participants, involved in the survey, listed that they previously lived in Melbourne before they immigrated to Israel. However, Sydney was also home to a significant number of Australian Jews who moved to Israel.

Age 
The participants who completed the survey were between the ages of 18 and 80. The most dominant age range was 18-39, followed closely by the age range of 40-59.

Gender 
The percentage of female immigrants was slightly larger than male immigrants; however, more females participated in the survey, which must be taken into account.

Denominational Affiliation 
Jews in Australia define themselves differently to those in Israel due to the variation in denominational terminology. In Australia, Jews are more widely spread across eight denominations of Judaism while Israeli citizens find themselves divided into four denominations. Australian Jews choose to either associate with no denomination or associate as being Conservative, Reform, Strictly Orthodox, Modern Orthodox, Traditional, Secular or Mixed Religion. Israeli Jews are either Religious (Modern Hebrew: דָתִי), Secular (Modern Hebrew: חִלּוֹנִי), Traditional (Modern Hebrew: מָסוֹרתִי) or Reform.

Motivations for emigration

Influential Factors 
A survey conducted in 2018-2019 prompted participants to evaluate the influential effect of various factors and how they did or didn't impact their final decision to leave Australia and permanently move to Israel. They were asked to rate the extent to which these factors influenced their final decision and were given three options to choose from for each factor - to a great extent; to a small extent; or not at all. These influential factors included both religious and secular aspects of life.

Jewish Educational Background

Education 

Research found that there was a strong correlation between Jewish education and immigration to Israel. Overall results demonstrated that 70% of all new immigrants to Israel had received some form of Jewish education at day-school; nearly 45% of those who spent more than a year visiting Israel were educated at a Jewish day-school; and 25% of individuals, who visited Israel for less than a year, had experienced a Jewish education of some form.

Hebrew Fluency 
Only a small percentage of participants revealed that they had no difficulties with the language upon arrival to Israel, while a large percentage admitted to experiencing difficulties with the language.

Socioeconomics

Residence 
New immigrants either reside in the city, a small town or on a kibbutz. Statistics show that currently 58% live in the city; 27% live in a small town; and 15% live on a kibbutz; however, upon arrival to Israel 78% lived in the city, while 5% lived in a small town and 12% lived on a kibbutz.

Economic Status 
Majority of the participants revealed that they were either living comfortably or getting along, while a small percentage claimed they were poor.

Notable people
 Yuval Freilich, épée fencer
 Mark Regev, diplomat and civil servant
 Raymond Apple, senior rabbi
 David Bar-Hayim, Orthodox rabbi and head of the Shilo Institute
 Yosl Bergner, painter
 Dvora Waysman, author
 Ben Zygier, veteran of the Israel Defense Forces accused of espionage

See also

 History of the Jews in Australia
 Aliyah
 Israeli in Australia
 Jewish ethnic divisions
 Australia–Israel relations

References

External links
 Australian Embassy in Israel
 InterNations - Australian expats in Is

 
 

 
Israeli Jews by national origin